Pirro Çako is an Albanian singer and composer. In 1988, he won the Festivali i Këngës as a composer with the song E duam lumturinë. The song was interpreted by Parashqevi Simaku. He has issued two albums: Herët a vonë in June 2004 and including 15 songs, and more recently, a second album, Mos më krahaso, a set of 12 songs. In a collaboration with composer Ardit Gjebrea, Çako wrote the song It's All About You, interpreted by Juliana Pasha for the Albanian national final for the Eurovision Song Contest 2010.

Life
Çako was born on 19 November 1965 in Tirana, Albania, to tenor Gaqo Çako and soprano Luiza Çako. Çako graduated from the Academy of Music and Arts of Albania and later obtained a degree in the École Normale de Musique de Paris for film music composing.

In 1988 E duam lumturinë, a song written by Çako, won the Albanian national festival. The song was interpreted by Parashqevi Simaku and has now transformed into an anthem of the children.

His duet with Rovena Dilo Për një çast më ndali zemra is considered to be one of Çako's best performances. The song participated in and won the Kënga Magjike (2001), a well-known musical event in Albania.

In 2010 in a collaboration with Ardit Gjebrea Çako wrote the song "It's All About You", interpreted by Juliana Pasha for the Albanian national final for the Eurovision Song Contest 2010. The song won the festival, and later it was written and performed in English. Çako also composed a song for Rovena Dilo in Rtsh Festival 2001 called AntiNostradamus (Antinostradamus) and participated in Rtsh 2009 with a song written by him & composed by him called "Nje Tjeter Jete" which received 4th place out of 20 participants.

Personal life
Çako was the former husband of the soprano, Inva Mula whom he married in 1987. According to their divorce files, Çako separated from Mula in 2007 and a divorce was completed in 2010 after 23 years of marriage. Çako and Mula have a son, Anthony Çako, born in 1995 in Paris France, where the couple shared a dwelling.

Albums
Çako published his first album Herët a vonë in June 2004. The album contains 15 songs, solos and duos with Rovena Dilo, Mariza Ikonomi, Redon Makashi, as well as Çako's former wife Inva Mula, a well-known soprano. In 2006, he issued a second album Mos më krahaso, a set of 12 songs, including the joyful "Letër Dashurie".

Awards and nominations

Festivali i Këngës

|-
||1988
||"E duam lumturinë"
|First Prize As Composer
|
|-
||2010
||"Nuk mundem pa ty"
|First Prize As Songwriter
|
|}

Kënga Magjike

|-
||2001
||"Për një çast më ndali zemra (ft.Rovena Dilo)"
|First Prize
|
|-
||2003
||"Unë Ai, Ti, Ajo"
|Best Songwriter in Festival
|
|-
|rowspan="2"|2004
|rowspan="2"|"Leter dashurie"
|Cesk Zadeja Prize
|
|-
|Third Prize
|
|-
||2008
||"Anjushka"
|Hit Song
|
|-
|rowspan="2"|2010
|rowspan="2"|"Mirëmbrëma si je"
|Best Songwriter in Festival
|
|-
|Second Prize
|
|-
|rowspan="2"|2011
|rowspan="2"|"Vetem Buje (ft.Vedat Ademi)"
|Style Song
|
|-
|Second Prize
|
|-
||2012
||"Dalldisa"
|Best Artistic Contribution
|
|}

Kult Awards

|-
||2007
||"Miku im"
|Best Album of the Year
|
|}

Video Fest Awards

|-
|rowspan="5"|2007
|rowspan="5"|"Ah, moj dashuria ime!"
|Best Video / First Prize
|
|-
|Best Male
|
|-
|Best Director
|
|-
|Best Production
|
|-
|Best Camera
|
|-
||2008
||"Engjell apo djallë"
|Best Camera
|
|}

References

External links
Official website

1965 births
Living people
Musicians from Tirana
20th-century Albanian male singers
Çako family
Kënga Magjike winners
Albanian pop musicians
21st-century Albanian male singers